The Connecticut Port Authority was signed into law by Connecticut Governor Dannel Malloy in 2014 to bring together the state's three deep-water ports of New London, New Haven, and Bridgeport under one statewide port authority. The Act helps Connecticut present a "united" front to international customers and will help prevent them from competing with each other.  The quasi-public authority will have power to issue bonds and will be financially autonomous from the state.  Oversight for the ports will be transferred to the Authority from the Connecticut Department of Transportation. The Connecticut Port Authority is reestablishing maritime commerce as an essential cornerstone of the state’s economy by making necessary improvements to the infrastructure at the ports and small harbors and strategically investing in high-potential growth areas.

References

Water transportation in Connecticut
Port authorities in the United States
Quasi-public agencies in Connecticut
2014 establishments in Connecticut